Odia cuisine is the cuisine of the Indian state of Odisha. Compared to other regional Indian cuisines, Odia cuisine uses less oil and is less spicy while nonetheless remaining flavourful. Rice is the staple food of this region. Mustard oil is used in some dishes as the cooking medium, but ghee (made of cow's milk) is preferred in temples. In old times food was traditionally served on copper plates or disposable plates made of sal leaves.

Odia cooks, particularly from the Puri region, were much sought after due to their ability to cook food in accordance with Hindu scriptures. During the 19th century, many Odia cooks were employed in Bengal and they took many Odia dishes with them.

Yoghurt is used in dishes.

Ingredients and seasoning
Rice is a major crop of Odisha along with wheat. Lentils such as pigeon peas and moong beans are another major ingredients.

Indigenous vegetables used in Odia cuisine are pumpkin, gourd , plantains, jackfruit, and papaya. Vegetables such as potatoes, cauliflowers, and cabbages are also used alongside local vegetables.

Pancha phutana is a blend of five spices that is widely used in Odia cuisine. It contains mustard, cumin, fenugreek, aniseed and kalonji(onion seeds). Garlic, onion and ginger are used in most of the food. Turmeric and jaggery are used regularly.

Local variation
The food in the region around Puri-Cuttack is greatly influenced by the Jagannath Temple. On the other hand, kalonji and mustard paste are used mostly in every part of the state. In the region closer to Andhra Pradesh, curry tree leaves and tamarind are used more. The Brahmapur region has influences of South Indian cuisine.

Temple food

Temples in the region make offerings to the presiding deities. The prasada of the Jagannath Temple is well known and is specifically called Maha Prasad meaning greatest of all prasadas. It consists of 56 recipes, so it is called . It is based on the legend that Krishna missed his eight meals for seven days while trying to save a village from a storm holding up the Govardhan hill as a shelter.

Fish and seafood
Fish and other seafood are eaten mainly in coastal areas. Several curries are prepared from crab, 
prawn and lobster with spices. Freshwater fish is available from rivers and irrigation canals.

List of dishes

Rice dishes and rotis

 Pakhala is a rice dish made by adding water with curd to cooked rice. It may then be allowed to ferment overnight. This is called basi pakhala and dahi pakhala. The unfermented version of this is called saja pakhala. It is served with green chillies, onions, yoghurt, badi etc. It is primarily eaten in summer.
 Khechidi is a rice dish cooked with lentils. It is the Odia version of khichdi.
 Palau is a rice dish made from meat, vegetables and raisins. It is the Odia version of pilaf.
 Kanika is a sweet rice dish, garnished with raisins and nuts.
 Ghee rice is fried with ghee and cinnamon

Dal

 Dalma: A dish made from dal and vegetables. It is generally made from toor dal and contains chopped vegetables like green papaya, plantain, eggplant, pumpkin, gourd, etc. It is garnished with turmeric, mustard seeds, and panch phutana. There are several variations of this dish.
 Dali: A dish made from one of the Dals like tur, horse gram chana, masur, mung or a combination of these.

Curries
 
 Santula: A dish of finely chopped vegetables which are sauteed with garlic, green chilies, mustard and spices. It has several variations.
 Ghuguni : A popular dish made from overnight soaked peas, potato with some moulds of horse gram powder to thicken the curry. It's a popular curry in street food mostly eaten with bara in undivided districts of Puri and Cuttack.
 Chhatu rai: A dish made from mushrooms and mustard.
 Alu potala rasa: Curry made from potato and pointed gourds.
 Kadali manja rai: A curry made from banana plant stem and mustard seeds. Manja refers to the stem which can be used in dalma.
 Mohura:
 Besara: Assorted vegetables in mustard paste tempered with pancha phutan

Khattas and chutneys

Khatta refers to a type of sour side dish or chutney usually served with Odia thalis.
 Dahi baigana: A sour dish made from yoghurt and eggplants.
 Dahi bhendi: A sour dish made from yoghurt and ladies fingers.
 Khajuri khata: A sweet-and-sour dish made from tomato and dates.
 Amba khatta: A khatta made from raw mangoes.
 Ou khatta: Elephant apple khatta
 Tomato khata: A sweet-and-sour dish made from tomato and jaggery
 Dhania-patra chutney: A chutney made from coriander leaves.

Shaag (salad greens)

In Odia cuisine, sāga is one of the most important leafy vegetables. It is popular all over the state. A list of the plants that are used as sāga is as below. Odias typically eat many cooked green leaves. They are prepared by adding "pancha phutan", with or without onion/garlic, and are best enjoyed with pakhala.
Kalama sāga (କଳମ ଶାଗ) Ipomoea aquatica (Water Spinach)
Kosalā/Khadā sāga (କୋସଳା ଶାଗ/ଖଡା ଶାଗ): prepared from amaranth leaves.
Bajji sāga (ବଜ୍ଜୀ ଶାଗ): Prepared from Amaranthus dubius leaves.
Leutiā sāga (ଲେଉଟିଆ ଶାଗ)Amaranthus viridis leaves and tender stems.
Pālanga sāga (ପାଳଙ୍ଗ ଶାଗ) spinach
Poi sāga (ପୋଈ ଶାଗ): prepared from basella leaves and tender stems.
Bāramāsi/Sajanā sāga (ବାରମାସି/ ସଜନା ଶାଗ): prepared from leaves of the drumstick tree. Cooked with lentils or alone with fried onions.
Sunusuniā sāga (ସୁନୁସୁନିଆ ଶାଗ) Marsilea polycarpa leaves.
Pitāgama sāga (ପିତାଗମା ଶାଗ)
Pidanga sāga (ପିଡଙ୍ଗ ଶାଗ)
Kakhāru sāga (କଖାରୁ ଶାଗ): Prepared from leaves of the pumpkin plant.
Madarangā sāga (ମଦରଙ୍ଗା ଶାଗ): prepared from leaves of Alternanthera sessilis.
Sorisa saga (ଶୋରିସ ଶାଗ) : Mustard greens
Methi sāga (ମେଥୀ ଶାଗ): prepared from methi or Fenugreek leaves and besara (mustard paste) cooked with vegetable.
Matara sāga (ମଟର ଶାଗ): The inner coating of peas is removed and then chopped to make the saga.

One of the most popular is lali koshala saaga made from green leaves with red stems. Some items are as follows:
 Saaga Bhaja
 Saaga Muga
 Saaga Badi
 Saaga Rai
 Saru patra tarkari

Pithas (sweet cakes)

Pithas and sweets are types of traditional Odia dishes.
 Podo pitha
 Enduri Pitha
 Arisa Pitha
 Kakara Pitha
 Manda Pitha
 Chakuli Pitha
 Dudura Pitha (Mostly prepared in Sambalpur and offered to Maa Samalei)

Egg, chicken and mutton
 Anda tarkari: An egg curry prepared with onion and tomato paste
 Chicken tarkari: A chicken curry 
 Chicken kasa
 Saru Patra Poda Chicken
 Mangsaw tarkari
 Mangsaw kasa
 Mangsaw besara
 Baunsaw Poda Mangsaw : Mutton or Chicken roasted inside bamboo.
 Patra Poda Mangsaw : Mutton or Chicken wrapped in leaves then roasted .
 Mati Handi Mangsaw : Mutton or Chicken cooked in earthen utensils.

Fish and other sea food

 lauda: A fish curry prepared with mustard paste.
 Machha Mahura: A curry prepared with lauda and lassan.
 Machha Jhola
 goton ka Jhola
 Dahi gotte
 Machha chhencheda : Fish mashed with a vegetable curry prepared in a ghee rich gravy.
 Chunna Machha Jhola: A fish curry, similar to Machha Jhola, but prepared with small smelt fish.
 Chunna Machha Tarkari: Small fried smelt fishes
 Chingudi Malai Tarkari: A prawn curry
 Kankada Jhola: Crab curry
 Chingudi chadchadi
 
 Mullet curry (ଖଅଙ୍ଗା ମାଛ ତରକାରୀ)
 Milkfish Curry (ସେବା ଖଙ୍ଗା ମାଛ ତରକାରୀ)
 smoked oil sardine (dry fish) with garlic- କୋକଲି ଶୁଖୁଆ ସେକା /ପୋଡା 
Smoked Dry sardine after cleaning mix with garlic, green chilly, salt using mortar and pestle or mixture grinder. Dry White bait fish (ଚାଉଳି ଶୁଖୁଆ), dry shrimp (ଚିଙ୍ଗୁଡ଼ି ଶୁଖୁଆ, ତାଂପେଡା) etc. also prepared like this flake/powdered. 
 seer fish (କଣି ମାଛ)/ mackerel (କାନାଗୁର୍ତ୍ଆ, ମରୁଆ) curry, chilly
 Bitter dry fish fry (ପିତା ଶୁଖୁଆ ଭଜା)- small freshwater nutrient fish dried in sun ray in hygienic manner and eaten fried or smocked. 
 ପୋହଳା ମାଛ ତରକାରୀ (minor /small carp fish curry). Fried small carp in onion or mustard based gravy. 
 Mola fry/ chips/ boiled grind. ମହୁରାଳୀ ମାଛ ଭଜା / ଛଣା / ଚକଟା. Very nutritious. After Cleaning wash, boil in less water, add salt and turmeric. Mix with mustard oil, green chilly, garlic, onion and grind.

Fritters and fries

 : A savory snack, similar to pakora or fritters, made with potatoes and onions, long-sliced, mixed and dipped in a batter of gram-flour, and then deep-fried
 Bhendi baigana bhaja: okra (ladies' fingers) and eggplant, sliced and deep-fried
 Badi chura: A coarse crushed mixture of sun-dried lentil dumplings (Badi), onion, garlic, green chillies and mustard oil
 Pampad : flat savory snack like deep-friend or roasted appetizer, which looks very similar to a roti, usually eaten during lunch time
 Phula badi: bigger and inflated versions of the normal Badi - a sun-dried lentil dumpling
 Sajana Chhuin Bhaja: drumsticks sliced into 3 to 3 inch long pieces and deep/shallow fried in oil
 Desi Kankada bhaja (ଦେଶୀ କାଙ୍କଡ଼ ଭଜା) - a vegetable found in hilly area and fried with oil, onion, dried chilli flake, cumin powder
 country potato fry (ଦେଶି ଆଳୁ/ଖମ୍ବ ଆଳୁ ଭଜା) - first slice into small pieces and half boil it with turmeric and salt. Then fry using oil in high flame. Add fried and powdered mustard, cumin red chilli to taste.
 Banana fry (କଞ୍ଚା କଦଳୀ ଭଜା)- as country potato fry
 Bamboo stem (ବାଉଁଶ କରଡି) recipe - usually done by people of hilli area/ Tribal people in dried form (ହେଂଡୁଅ)for flavour or raw as curry, fry, chips. 
 ନଡ଼ିଆ ବରା coconut vada
ପିଠଉ ଦିଆ ଭଜା (Fry with rice and urad dal mix batter)- different Vegetable/ vegetables slice with rice batter (added cumin, salt, dalcchini, ginger, garlic, onion,  green chilli paste) 
For example- jack fruit  fry, brinjal  fry, gourd  fry,  flower  fry, etc.

Snacks

 Ghugni: A spicy dish made from peas, can be served with pooris.
 Gupchup
 Chaat
 Dahibara Aludam 
 Chanachura or Baramaza
 Piaji
 Bara
 Gulgula
 Chuda (Poha) Bhaja
 Chuda (Poha) Dahi as breakfast
 Mudhi (Mur mura) as breakfast or evening snacks
 Khai 
 Chauhla bhaja
 Checha Piaji
 Kachodi chaat
 Suji Bara
 Pakudi
 Aloo chop
 Baigani
 Dantikili
 Singada (samosa)

Desserts and sweets

 Kheeri: Kheeri is the Odia word for kheer, predominantly made of rice.
 Chhena Poda: A sweet made from soft cheese dipped in sugar syrup and baked. It may contain dry fruits.
 Chhena Gaja
 Malpua
 Kora
 Khira sagara
 Khirsapani
 Chhena kheeri
 Suji kheeri
 Chhena Jhili
 Rasagola
 Rasabali
 Rasmalai
Sarsatia
 Aadasi
 Attakali
 Khaja
 Magaj Ladu
 Gajja : a light savory snack
 Rabidi : a sweet curd like dish 
 Mudki: A famous savory snack which resembles a jalebi but the only difference being that jalebi are on the sweet palette where as mudki are light and more savoury
 Chenna Mudki
 Mathapuli: a dessert made out of urad dal and sugar syrup. Found in Khurda District, particularly in places such as Tangi, Chandapur, Banapur.

Drinks

There are many traditional alcoholic and non-alcoholic drinks which are unique to Odisha. Some are made during specific festivals or as an offering to gods and others are made all year. The drinks which have a thick consistency are usually called paṇa and the ones with have a watery consistency are usually known as sarbat. Many of the ethnic tribes of Odisha have their own indigenous drinks made from forest produce. Any drink that contains alcohol is usually called madya

Alcoholic
 Aamba mada - mango-based alcoholic beverage
 Aakhu mada - sugarcane-based alcoholic beverage
 Amrutabhanda mada - papaya-based alcoholic beverage
 Anlaa mada - Indian gooseberry-based alcoholic beverage
 Dimiri tadi - juice of Indian fig-based alcoholic beverage
 Dimiri mada - pulp of Indian fig-based alcoholic beverage
 Handia - traditional rice beer popular among the tribes of Odisha
 Kadali mada - banana-based alcoholic beverage
 Guda mada - jaggery-based alcoholic beverage
 Pijuli mada - guava-based alcoholic beverage
 Jamukoli mada - Malabar plum-based alcoholic beverage
 Jana mada  - maize-based alcoholic beverage
 Tala mada - palm-based alcoholic beverage
 Kumuda mada - squash-based alcoholic beverage
 Landa - rice-based alcoholic beverage
 Mahulu mada or mahuli - mahua flower-based alcoholic beverage
 Panasa mada - jackfruit-based alcoholic beverage
 Pendum - rice-based alcoholic beverage consumed by the Bonda tribe
 Rasi - a type of rice beer related to handia; popular among the tribes of Odisha
 Sagur - alcoholic beverage made from different fruit nuts, mahua flowers or fruits using the process of distillation known as sagur by the Bonda tribe
 Salapi - palm-based alcoholic beverage
 Sapung - sago palm-based alcoholic beverage consumed by the Bonda tribe
 Sindi mada - date palm-based alcoholic beverage
 Tamati mada - tomato-based alcoholic beverage
 Tetel mada - tamarind-based alcoholic beverage

Cannabis-based
 Bhangaw sarbat or  - beverage containing a paste of

Non-alcoholic
 Adhara paṇa - a milk and chhena-based drink offered to the trinity at the end of Ratha Yatra
 Amba paṇa - a mango-based summer drink
 Bela paṇa - a drink made from wood or stone apple during Pana Sankranti festival
 Dahi pudina sarbat - a summer drink made using curd and mint leaves
 Ghola dahi - buttermilk with spices
 Landa bagula dahi sarbat - a drink made from curd and sweet basil seeds
 Lemonade - summer drink made from water, lemon, sugar and salt
 Khajuri misri - summer drinks made from date palm misri, lemon and sweet basil seeds
 Mandia peja - a millet-based summer drink
 Jhara Paṇa - a summer drink made from arrowroot and jaggery in southern Odisha
 Tanka toraṇi - a rice-water based drink prepared in Jagannath Temple

References

Further reading

External links

 Traditional recipes
 Traditional recipes in Hindi

Indian cuisine by state or union territory
Culture of Odisha